Biker Build-Off is a reality television series for the Discovery Channel. Created and narrated by Thom Beers, the series was originally conceived as a single special called The Great Biker Build-Off. The show proved so popular that more episodes were produced in succeeding years, to the point that it was turned into a regular series (and its name shortened to just Biker Build-Off) in 2005.

Premise of the Show
Two reputed custom motorcycle builders from different parts of the country—usually with very different styles of building—each build a unique custom bike in their respective style, pitting their teams and expertise against each other to see who is the better builder.

Format
Biker Build-Off was originally an irregularly-grouped series (termed "rounds") of contests that spanned a calendar year. The original Great Biker Build-Off was a single competition. In 2003, the second round had three contests, and the third round (2004) had six. In 2005, the program was turned into a regular series in which each round would feature a total of 13 contests each. There has also been a World Biker Build-Off special (pitting three international bikers) in 2004.

The rules
Various aspects of the rules have evolved over the course of the series. When the show became a regular series, the current rules of the Biker Build-Off were defined as follows:

1. Each builder has 10 days to build a working custom motorcycle in his or her respective style.

They must obtain a framework, engine, and other necessary parts, construct their unique body, have it painted, and then complete assembling the bike and make it operational before midnight of the tenth day. During this build period, the show switches perspectives back and forth between the two builders as they and their respective teams plan and build their bikes.

2. Upon completion, the two builders bring their bikes to a mutually-agreed neutral location.

 Custom motorcycle master of ceremonies Hugh King (co-executive producer of the series) will meet the two builders at the agreed location and declare where the ride will go and where the bikes will ultimately be judged.

3. When they meet, the two builders and their teams will begin a lengthy ride to a bike show.

 The ride is designed to "break in" each bike and ensure they're both truly road-worthy before they reach the bike show. If a problem emerges that prevents the bike from running, the builder is allowed one hour to repair it before he/she is disqualified.  (The disqualification may be waived by the competing builder; several shows have featured instances where the bike would have been disqualified ("DQ'ed") but the other builder did not enforce the rule.)

4. At the bike show, the two bikes will be showcased and a winner decided by an audience ballot.

 Exceptions may occur for specific competitions. A 2007 contest designed to build drag bikes was decided by a best-of-three set of drag races.

Episode guide

Round 1: 2002

 Billy Lane vs. Roger Bourget : Original run : September 28, 2002

Round 2: 2003
 Billy Lane vs. Dave Perewitz : Original run : September 1, 2003
 Indian Larry vs. Paul Yaffe : Original run : September 1, 2003
 Billy Lane vs. Indian Larry : Original run : September 1, 2003

Round 3: 2004
 Chica vs. Hank Young : Original run : June 21, 2004
 Cory Ness vs. Arlen Ness : Original run : June 22, 2004
 Russell Mitchell vs. Eddie Trotta : Original run : June 23, 2004
 Mitch Bergeron vs. Kendall Johnson : Original run : June 24, 2004
 Matt Hotch vs. Joe Martin : Original run : June 27, 2004
 Combined Genius : Original run : June 27, 2004

World Biker Build-Off 2004
 Joe Martin vs. Russell Mitchell  vs. Scotty Cox : Original run : September 6, 2004

Round 4: 2005
 Jerry Covington vs. Warren Vesely : Original run : January 11, 2005
 Joe Martin vs. Shinya Kimura : Original run : January 18, 2005
 Jesse Rooke  vs. Ron Finch : Original run : January 25, 2005
 Russell Mitchell  vs. the Detroit Brothers : Original run : February 1, 2005
 Indian Larry vs. Mondo : Original run : February 8, 2005
 Chica vs. Mike Pugliese : Original run : February 15, 2005
 Cory Ness vs. Eric Gorges : Original run : February 22, 2005
 Hank Young vs. Cole Foster : Original run : March 1, 2005
 Billy Lane vs. Mike Brown : Original run : March 8, 2005
 Kendall Johnson vs. Eddie Trotta : Original run : March 15, 2005
 Matt Hotch vs. Rick Fairless : Original run : March 22, 2005
 Arlen Ness vs. Roland Sands : Original run : March 29, 2005
 The Ultimate Chop : Original run : April 3, 2005

Round 5: 2006
 Billy Lane vs. Russell Mitchell : Original run : August 7, 2006
 Trevelene vs. Scott Long : Original run : August 14, 2006
 Mike Metzger vs. Larry Linkogle : Original run : August 21, 2006
 Kevin Alsop vs. Ivy Tosclair : Original run : August 28, 2006
 Roland Sands vs. Jesse Rooke : Original run : September 4, 2006
 Ell Pitts vs. Harold Pontarelli : Original run : September 11, 2006
 Marcus Walz vs. Michael Prugh : Original run : September 18, 2006
 Detroit Brothers vs. Jason Kangas : Original run : September 25, 2006
 Gypsy Charro vs. Kim Suter : Original run : October 2, 2006
 Paul Yaffe vs. Dave Perewitz : Original run : October 9, 2006
 Craig Whitford vs. Mike Long : Original run : October 16, 2006
 Brian Klock vs. Jason Hart : Original run : October 23, 2006
 Matt Hotch vs. Roger Goldammer : Original run : October 30, 2006

Round 6: 2007
 Gard Hollinger vs. Jason Hart
 Paul Cox & Keino vs. Trevelen
 Chica vs. Michael Barragan
 Bryan Fuller vs. Greg Westbury
 Dawn Norakas vs. Scott Webster
 Andrew Williams vs. James Compton

External links
 
 
 

American non-fiction television series
2002 American television series debuts
2000s American reality television series
2007 American television series endings
Discovery Channel original programming
Television series by Original Productions
Motorcycle television series